Charkha may refer to:

 Charkha (spinning wheel), a type of Indian spinning wheel referenced in the teachings of Mahatma Gandhi
 "The Cult of the Charkha", a 1925 essay by Rabindranath Tagore
 Charkha (Dhari, Gujarat), a village and former princely state in Gujarat, western India
 Charkha Audiobooks, an imprint of the publisher Karadi Tales

See also
 Charka (disambiguation)